Tomboy is a 1940 American romance film directed by Robert F. McGowan and written by Dorothy Davenport and Marion Orth. The film stars Marcia Mae Jones, Jackie Moran, Grant Withers, Charlotte Wynters, George Cleveland and Marvin Stephens. The film was released on April 20, 1940, by Monogram Pictures.

Plot

Cast          
Marcia Mae Jones as Pat Kelly
Jackie Moran as Steve
Grant Withers as Charlie Kelly
Charlotte Wynters as Frances 
George Cleveland as Matt
Marvin Stephens as Harry 
Clara Blandick as Martha
Gene Morgan as First Tramp

References

External links
 

1940 films
American romance films
1940s romance films
Monogram Pictures films
Films directed by Robert F. McGowan
American black-and-white films
1940s English-language films
1940s American films